Fun is the eleventh studio album by American country music artist Garth Brooks. Announced in 2018, the album experienced production delays and its release was postponed due to the COVID-19 pandemic, eventually culminating in a release date of November 20, 2020. The lead single, "All Day Long", was released on June 19, 2018, followed by a second single, "Stronger Than Me", on November 19, 2018. The third single, "Dive Bar", a duet featuring Blake Shelton, was released on June 18, 2019. The fourth single, "Shallow", a duet featuring Trisha Yearwood, was released on December 1, 2020. The fifth single, "That's What Cowboys Do" was released on June 29, 2021. A selection of seven tracks were available for streaming via Amazon Music prior to the album's release.

Track listing

Personnel
Adapted from liner notes.

Roy Agee – horns
David Angell – strings
Monisa Angell – strings
Sam Bacco – percussion
Jeff Bailey – horns
Robert Bailey – backing vocals
Carrie Bailey – strings
Kevin Bate – strings
Eddie Bayers – drums
Jenny Bifano – strings
Bruce Bouton – pedal steel and lap steel guitars
Garth Brooks – vocals, acoustic guitar, producer
Dennis Burnside – horn and string arrangements
David Campbell – horn and string arrangements
Bruce Christensen – strings
Janet Darnell – strings
David Davidson – strings
Eleonore Denig – strings
Gabe Dixon – keyboards, piano
Mark Douthit – horns
Jason Eskridge – backing vocals
Connie Ellisor – strings
Kim Fleming – backing vocals
Quentin Flowers – strings
Barry Green – horns
Rob Hajacos – fiddle
Vicki Hampton – backing vocals
Michael Haynes – horns
Anthony LaMarchina – strings
Betsy Lamb – strings
Chris Leuzinger – acoustic and electric guitars
Sam Levine – horns
Zoya Leybin – strings
Steve Mackey – bass guitar
Blair Masters – keyboards and piano
Jimmy Mattingly – fiddle
Joey Miskulin – accordion
Doug Moffet – horns
Wendy Moten – backing vocals
Billy Panda – acoustic guitar
Steve Patrick – horns
Charley Pride – duet vocals on "Where the Cross Don't Burn"
Carole Rabinowitz-Neune – strings
Blake Shelton – duet vocals on "Dive Bar"
Milton Sledge – drums, percussion
Caitlyn Smith – backing vocals
Bobby Terry – acoustic guitar
Alan Umstead – strings
Cathy Umstead – strings
Mary Katherine Vanosdale – strings
Kris Wilkinson – strings
Karen Winklemann – strings
Bobby Wood – keyboards and piano
Glenn Worf – bass guitar
Trisha Yearwood – background vocals, duet vocals on "Shallow"

Charts

Weekly charts

Year-end charts

References

2020 albums
Garth Brooks albums
Albums postponed due to the COVID-19 pandemic